Many Moods of the Upsetters is a studio album by the Upsetters, released in 1970.

Track listing

Side one
"Exray Vision"
"Cant Take It Anymore" – David Isaacs
"Soul Stew"
"Low Light"
"Cloud Nine" – Carl Dawkins
"Beware"

Side two
"Serious Joke"
"Goosy" – Pat Satchmo
"Prove It"
"Boss Society" – Pat Satchmo
"Mean & Dangerous"
"Games People Play"
"Extra" (sometimes omitted on UK Pama Economy pressings)

The Upsetters albums
1970 albums
Pama Records albums
Albums produced by Lee "Scratch" Perry